Bertheau is a surname. Notable people with the surname include:

Charles Bertheau (1660–1732), French pastor
Ernst Bertheau (1812–1888), German orientalist and theologian
Julien Bertheau (1910–1995), French actor
Margarita Bertheau (1913–1975), Costa Rican painter and cultural promoter
Peter Bertheau, Swedish bridge player
Therese Bertheau (1861–1936), Norwegian mountaineer